Jim McCauley is also a name assumed by the banned David Frost (sports agent)

James Adelbert McCauley (March 24, 1863 in Stanley, New York – September 14, 1930) was a 19th-century Major League Baseball catcher. He played from 1884 to 1886 for the St. Louis Browns, Buffalo Bisons, Chicago White Stockings and Brooklyn Grays.

External links
Baseball-Reference page
Baseball Almanac

1863 births
1930 deaths
19th-century baseball players
Baseball players from New York (state)
Major League Baseball catchers
St. Louis Browns players
Brooklyn Grays players
Buffalo Bisons (NL) players
Chicago White Stockings players
Minneapolis Millers (baseball) players
LaCrosse Freezers players
Chicago Maroons players
Canandaigua Rustlers players
Hartford Bluebirds players
Union Dutchmen baseball players